Siwai Rural LLG is a local-level government (LLG) of the Autonomous Region of Bougainville, Papua New Guinea. The Siwai language is spoken in the LLG.

Wards
01. Mukakuru
02. Rataiku
03. Konga
04. Ruhwaku
05. Korikunu
06. Hari
07. Tokunutu
08. Huyono
09. Motuna

References

Local-level governments of the Autonomous Region of Bougainville